and  are two separate Japanese surnames, distinguished by the length of the vowel in the first syllable of each surname. They are sometimes spelled identically in romanisation due to omission of the macron in the latter surname. Notable people with these surnames include:

, comedian
, politician
, animator and film director
, professional baseball player
, idol, model, actress and member of the Japanese girls idol group Hinatazaka46
, samurai warrior
, member of the Konami-produced J-Pop group BeForU
, race walker
, gravure idol
, politician

Fictional characters:
, a character from The World God Only Knows
, a character from Love Live!
, a character from Oreimo
, a character from To Heart 2
, a character from Sound! Euphonium

See also
, town located in Kazuno District, Akita Prefecture, Japan

Japanese-language surnames